Plant pathology has developed from antiquity, but scientific study began in the Early modern period and developed in the 19th century.

Early history
300–286 BC; Theophrastus, father of botany, wrote and studied diseases of trees, cereals and legumes

17th century
1665; Robert Hooke illustrates a plant-pathogenic fungal disease, rose rust
1675; Antony van Leeuwenhoek invents the compound microscope, in 1683 describes bacteria seen with the microscope

18th century
1729; Pier Antonio Micheli observes fungal spores, conducts germination experiments
1755; Mathieu Tillet reports on treatment of seeds

19th century
1802; Lime sulfur first used to control plant disease
1845–1849; Potato late blight epidemic in Ireland
1853; Heinrich Anton de Bary, father of modern mycology, establishes that fungi are the cause, not the result, of plant diseases, publishes "Untersuchungen uber die Brandpilze"
1858; Julius Kühn publishes "Die Krankheiten der Kultergewachse"
1865; M. Planchon discovers a new species of Phylloxera, which was named Phylloxera vastatrix.
1868–1882; Coffee rust epidemic in Sri Lanka
1871; Thomas Taylor publishes the first USDA papers on microscopic plant pathogens
1875; Mikhail Woronin identified the cause of clubroot as a "plasmodiophorous organism" and gave it the name Plasmodiophora brassicae
1876; Fusarium oxysporum f.sp. cubense, responsible for Panama disease, discovered in bananas in Australia
1878–1885; Downy mildew of grape epidemic in France
1879; Robert Koch establishes germ theory: diseases are caused by microorganisms
1882; Lehrbuch der Baumkrankheiten (Textbook of Diseases of Trees), by Robert Hartig, is published in Berlin, the first textbook of forest pathology.
1885; Bordeaux mixture introduced by Pierre-Marie-Alexis Millardet to control downy mildew on grape
1885; Experimental proof that bacteria can cause plant diseases: Erwinia amylovora and fire blight of apple
1886–1898; Recognition of plant viral diseases: Tobacco mosaic virus
1889; Introduction of hot water treatment of seed for disease control by J. L. Jensen

20th century
1902; First chair of plant pathology established, in Copenhagen
1904; Mendelian inheritance of cereal rust resistance demonstrated
1907; First academic department of plant  pathology established at Cornell University
1908; American Phytopathological Society founded
1910; Panama disease reaches Western Hemisphere
1911; Scientific journal Phytopathology founded
1925; Panama disease reaches every banana-growing country in the Western Hemisphere
1951; European and Mediterranean Plant Protection Organization (EPPO) founded
1967; Recognition of plant pathogenic mycoplasma-like organisms
1971; T. O. Diener discovers viroids, organisms smaller than viruses

References

Economic botany
Historical timelines
Phytopathology